Preshafood Limited is a food and beverage company in Melbourne, Australia. Originally named Donny Boy Fresh Food Company, the company’s flagship product is its range of Preshafruit juices and fruit products, utilizing high pressure processing (HPP) technologies.

Established in 2006 by former retail executive Andrew Gibb and his father Donald Gibb, Preshafood began via close collaboration with Food Science Australia’s Innovative Foods Centre.

At the international foodbev.com Beverage Innovation Awards 2009, Preshafood won first prize in the Best New Juice or Juice Drink and Best New Beverage Concept categories for its Preshafruit range of juices.

Preshafood won the 2011 Panasonic Australia Medium Business Award.

References

External links 
 Official Preshafruit Website

Manufacturing companies based in Melbourne
Food and drink companies of Australia
Drink companies of Australia
Australian companies established in 2006
Food and drink companies established in 2006